Jeffrey "Jeff" Wittman (born March 4, 1971) is a former NCAA Division III All-American running back at Ithaca College. In 2013, he was inducted into the College Football Hall of Fame.

References

1971 births
Living people
American football running backs
Ithaca Bombers football players
College Football Hall of Fame inductees